State Highway 57 (SH 57) is a State Highway in Kerala, India that starts in Kasaragod and ends in Kanhangad. The highway is 28 km long.

The Route Map 
Kasaragod – Uduma – Bekal - Pallikkara – Chamundikunnu - Kanhangad South

See also 
Roads in Kerala
List of State Highways in Kerala
Kerala

References 

State Highways in Kerala
Kanhangad area
Roads in Kasaragod district